Lecanora xanthoplumosella is a species of crustose lichen in the family Lecanoraceae. Known from Australia, it was described as new to science in 2011.

See also
List of Lecanora species

References

xanthoplumosella
Lichen species
Lichens described in 2011
Lichens of Australia
Taxa named by Helge Thorsten Lumbsch
Taxa named by John Alan Elix